Almirante Grau may refer to:
BAP Almirante Grau, several different ships
Miguel Grau Seminario, for whom the ships were named